The 1981 Tirreno–Adriatico was the 16th edition of the Tirreno–Adriatico cycle race and was held from 14 March to 19 March 1981. The race started in Rome and finished in San Benedetto del Tronto. The race was won by Francesco Moser of the Famcucine–Campagnolo team.

General classification

References

1981
1981 in Italian sport
1981 Super Prestige Pernod